Ryan Neuzil (born July 31, 1997) is an American football guard for the Atlanta Falcons of the National Football League (NFL).

Early life and education
Neuzil was born on July 31, 1997, in Bradenton, Florida. He attended Braden River High School and played tight end there, recording 26 receptions for 470 yards and two touchdowns as a senior. He was a first-team all-district and all-area selection at tight end, and also served as the team's punter, having an average of 45 yards-per-punt.

A two-star prospect, Neuzil chose Appalachian State out of 12 scholarship offers. His position was changed to center upon joining the school's football team. As a true freshman in 2016, Neuzil redshirted. In 2017, he appeared in seven games, beginning the year as backup center before being moved to starter at left guard. As a sophomore in 2018, Neuzil started all 13 games as a left guard and was selected second-team all-conference by Pro Football Focus (PFF).

Neuzil was named a first-team all-conference selection as a junior in 2019, having started all 14 games as the team's left guard. In 2020, he started 12 games and was named first-team all-conference by PFF and third-team by the league's media and coaches. He was also named second-team All-American by Sporting News and PFF, and was a fourth-team selection by Phil Steele. He declared for the NFL Draft following the season.

Professional career
After going unselected in the 2021 NFL Draft, Neuzil was signed by the Atlanta Falcons as an undrafted free agent. He was waived at the final roster cuts but was re-signed to the practice squad afterwards. He was released on October 29, but was then brought back on November 1. After spending the entire 2021 season on the practice squad, Neuzil signed a future contract with Atlanta in January 2022. Neuzil was elevated to the active roster for the Falcons' week nine game against the Los Angeles Chargers, and made his NFL debut in the 17–20 loss, appearing on four special teams snaps. He was promoted to the active roster on November 22, 2022.

Personal life
Neuzil's father Jeff played in the Kansas City Royals organization at the Triple-A level.

References

1997 births
Living people
American football offensive guards
American football centers
American football tight ends
Players of American football from Florida
Sportspeople from Bradenton, Florida
Appalachian State Mountaineers football players
Atlanta Falcons players